Fistulobalanus is a genus of barnacles, comprising the following species:
Fistulobalanus abeli (Lami & André, 1932)
Fistulobalanus albicostatus (Pilsbry, 1916)
Fistulobalanus amaraquaticus (Yamaguchi, 1980)
Fistulobalanus citerosum (Henry, 1973)
Fistulobalanus dentivarians (Henry, 1973)
†Fistulobalanus klemmi Zullo, 1984
Fistulobalanus kondakovi (Tarasov & Zevina, 1957)
Fistulobalanus pallidus (Darwin, 1854)
Fistulobalanus patelliformis (Bruguière, 1789)
Fistulobalanus shiloensis (Pilsbry, 1930)
Fistulobalanus sumbawaensis Prabowo & Yamaguchi, 2005
Fistulobalanus suturaltus (Henry, 1973)

References

Barnacles